The 'Society of EMC Engineers (India) (SEMCEI) is a professional society for engineers working on the subject of ElectroMagnetic Interference / ElectroMagnetic Compatibility (EMI/EMC) in India.

References

External links 
 SEMCEI Website

Indian engineering organisations